Fletch Won is a mystery/comedy novel written by American Gregory Mcdonald, and published in 1985.

It is the eighth book to star the character Fletch, but is a prequel set before the events of first seven books in the series. The title is a play on words, reflecting it's canonical position in the timeline, with "won" being a homophone of the word "one". The novel follows the early days of the title character's journalism career. Irwin "Fletch" Fletcher is moved off of obituaries and wedding announcements at the News Tribune and is assigned his first journalistic interview, only to have the subject turn up dead in the newspaper's parking lot. He investigates, beginning his dual profession of journalist and investigator.

A film adaptation of the novel has been in development for some time with a number of different persons attached.

Plot summary
During what is effectively a prequel, Fletch has only been at the News-Tribune as a junior reporter for a short time and Frank (his editor) is losing respect for his new employee. Frank moves Fletch to a different section of the newspaper more than once, but Fletch continues to cause trouble. When Fletch is to run the story of local lawyer Donald Habeck, who requests an interview in order to announce that he is giving 5 million dollars to a local museum, the lawyer turns up dead in the News-Tribune parking lot.

Unsurprisingly Frank takes Fletch off the story and gives it to an experienced reporter who has been with the paper for years. Fletch is now charged with investigating a whorehouse—which he does. However, he is not about to give up on the Habeck story, the circumstances of which seem mighty suspicious, especially when Fletch starts to suspect that the legal firm Habeck worked for is one of the most crooked firms around.

Characters
I. M. Fletcher (Fletch) – protagonist
Frank Jaffe – Fletch's editor at the paper
Donald Habeck – a lawyer, killed in the newspaper parking lot.

Release details
1985, USA, Warner Books, Pub date ? ? 1985, hardback (First edition)
1985, USA, Gollancz, Pub date ? ? 1985, hardback 
1988, USA, Outlet, Pub date ? April 1988, hardback 
1989, USA, Warner Books, Pub date 31 December 1989, paperback
1993, USA, Thorndike Press, Pub date ? December 1993, hardback (Large Print edition)
2002, USA, Vintage Books, Pub date ? July 2002, paperback

External links
 
 Fletch Won

1985 novels
American crime novels
American comedy novels
Novels about journalists
Warner Books books